Smirnov is a volcano located at the northwestern end of Kunashir Island, Kuril Islands, Russia. It consists of two summits: Smirnov and Rurui (Rurui-dake) stratovolcanoes. Rurui is the higher summit.

See also
 List of volcanoes in Russia

References 
 

Kunashir Island
Mountains of the Kuril Islands
Volcanoes of the Kuril Islands
Stratovolcanoes of Russia
Pleistocene stratovolcanoes
Pleistocene Asia